Grimser's collared lizard (Crotaphytus grismeri) is a species of lizard in the family Iguanidae. The species is endemic to Baja California, Mexico.

Etymology
The specific name, grismeri, is in honor of American herpetologist Larry Lee Grismer.

Geographic range
In Baja California, C. grismeri is found in the Sierra de Los Cucapah and the contiguous Sierra el Mayor.

Reproduction
C. grismeri is oviparous.

References

Further reading
McGuire, Jimmy A. (1994). "A new species of collared lizard (Iguania: Crotaphytidae) from northeastern Baja California, México". Herpetologica 51 (4): 438-450 (Crotaphytus grismeri, new species).

Crotaphytus
Endemic reptiles of Mexico
Endemic fauna of the Baja California Peninsula
Reptiles described in 1994
Taxa named by Jimmy Adair McGuire